Seamus Clancy is a Gaelic footballer from Kilnaboy County Clare. He won a Munster Senior Football Championship in 1992 when Clare had a surprise win over Kerry in the final, he later won an All Star award and is to date Clare's only football All Star. He also won an All Ireland B Title with Clare in 1991. He won McGrath Cup medals in 1990, 1991, 1994 as captain and 1995.

References

Clare inter-county Gaelic footballers
Kilnaboy Gaelic footballers
Living people
Year of birth missing (living people)